"Nameless" is a song by American rapper Lil Keed, released on December 11, 2018 along with a music video. It is the second single from his fourth mixtape Keed Talk to 'Em (2018). It was produced by Goose.

Composition
Alphonse Pierre of Pitchfork described the song as a "lovestruck ballad made to be screenshotted and posted on every high schooler's IG story". Over a "dreamy" beat, Lil Keed sings about his relationship.

Critical reception
Alex Zidel of HotNewHipHop considered the song as one of the best from Keed Talk to 'Em. He added, "Keed's melodic work is stellar on 'Nameless' as his staccato flows will be stuck in your head after a few listens."

Charts

Certifications

References

2018 singles
2018 songs
300 Entertainment singles